Denis Vasilyevich Voynov (born 1 March 1990) is a Russian former football midfielder.

Career
Voynov made his professional debut for FC Lokomotiv Moscow on 15 July 2009 in the Russian Cup game against FC SKA-Energiya Khabarovsk.

External links

1990 births
People from Fryazino
Living people
Russian footballers
Russia youth international footballers
Russia under-21 international footballers
Association football midfielders
FC Lokomotiv Moscow players
FC Torpedo Moscow players
PFC Spartak Nalchik players
FC Pyunik players
Russian expatriate footballers
Expatriate footballers in Armenia
Armenian Premier League players
FC Fakel Voronezh players
FC Avangard Kursk players
Sportspeople from Moscow Oblast